Peter Shuman (19 January 1933 – 29 January 1993) was a South African cricketer. He played in thirteen first-class matches from 1954/55 to 1963/64.

References

External links
 

1933 births
1993 deaths
South African cricketers
Border cricketers
Free State cricketers